The Captain from Köpenick is a 1956 West German comedy film directed by Helmut Käutner and based upon the 1931 play The Captain of Köpenick by Carl Zuckmayer. The play was based on the true story of Wilhelm Voigt, a German impostor who masqueraded as a Prussian military officer in 1906 and became famous as the Captain from Köpenick. It was nominated for the 29th Academy Awards in the category Best Foreign Language Film.

It was shot by Real Film at the Wandsbek Studios in Hamburg. The film's sets were designed by the art director Albrecht Becker and Herbert Kirchhoff.

Cast 

Heinz Rühmann as Wilhelm Voigt
Martin Held as Dr. Obermüller
Hannelore Schroth as Mathilde Obermüller
Willy A. Kleinau as Friedrich Hoprecht
Leonard Steckel as Adolph Wormser
Friedrich Domin as Jail Director
Erich Schellow as Capt. von Schlettow
Walter Giller as Willy Wormser
Wolfgang Neuss as Kallenberg
Bum Krüger as Schutzmann Kilian
Joseph Offenbach as Wabschke
Ilse Fürstenberg as Marie Hoprecht, Voigt's sister
Maria Sebaldt as Auguste Viktoria Wormser, seine Tochter
Edith Hancke as Sick girl
Ethel Reschke as Pleureusenmieze
Siegfried Lowitz as Stadtkämmerer Rosenkranz
Willi Rose as Police sergeant
Willy Maertens as Prokurist Knell
Kurt Fuß
Karl Hellmer as Nowak
Robert Meyn as Polizeipräsident von Jagow
Otto Wernicke as Schuhmachermeister
Ludwig Linkmann as Betrunkener Zivilist
Wolfgang Müller
Rudolf Fenner as Polizeioberwachtmeister in Potsdam
Reinhard Kolldehoff as Drunken soldier
Kurt Klopsch as Polizei-Inspektor von Köpenick
Helmut Gmelin as Kürassier-Oberst
Reinhold Nietschmann
Jutta Zech
Jochen Blume as Paß-Kommissar
Peter Ahrweiler as Anstaltsgeistlicher
Jochen Meyn as Von Schleinitz
Werner Schumacher as 2.Gefreiter
Joachim Hess as 1.Gefreiter
Balduin Baas as Ostpreußischer Grenadier
Peter Franz
Joachim Wolff as 2.Bahnbeamter
Erich Weiher as Dorfschulze
Holger Hagen as Dr. Jellinek
Eddi Thomalla as 1. Bahnbeamter

Awards
 Nominated for the 29th Academy Awards in the category Best Foreign Language Film
 Bundesfilmpreis (Filmband in Gold) in the categories Best Actor, Best Director, Best Screenplay and Best Film Architecture
 Bundesfilmpreis (Filmband in Silber) in the category Best Film Promoting Democracy
 Bundesfilmpreis (Goldene Schale) in the category Best Feature Film
 Bambi in the categories Best Film and Most Commercially Successful Film
 Preis der deutschen Filmkritik
 Price of the Berlin Film Critics Association for Heinz Rühmann
 Special Merit recognition by the Filmbewertungsstelle Wiesbaden
 Screened at the Venice Film Festival, the Edinburgh International Film Festival and the San Francisco International Film Festival

See also
 Wilhelm Voigt
 Der Hauptmann von Köpenick (disambiguation)
 List of submissions to the 29th Academy Awards for Best Foreign Language Film
 List of German submissions for the Academy Award for Best Foreign Language Film
 The Captain from Köpenick (1926 film)
 The Captain from Köpenick (1931 film)
 The Captain from Köpenick (1945 film)
 Der Hauptmann von Köpenick (1997 film)

References

External links 

 Der Hauptmann von Köpenick at filmportal.de/en

1956 films
1950s historical comedy-drama films
German historical comedy-drama films
West German films
1950s German-language films
Films directed by Helmut Käutner
German films based on plays
Films based on works by Carl Zuckmayer
Films about con artists
Films set in 1906
Films set in Berlin
Films shot in Hamburg
Remakes of German films
Real Film films
Films shot at Wandsbek Studios
German biographical films
Biographical films about fraudsters
Cultural depictions of Wilhelm Voigt
1950s biographical films
1950s German films